Simone Vagnozzi (born 30 May 1983) is an Italian former professional tennis player.

Vagnozzi had a career high ATP singles ranking of world No. 161 achieved on 7 November 2011. He also had a career high ATP doubles ranking of world No. 74 achieved on 4 April 2011.

Vagnozzi made his ATP Tour singles debut at the 2004 Grand Prix Hassan II on clay courts in Casablanca, Morocco when he successfully advanced through three qualifying rounds to reach his first career main draw. In qualifying he defeated Talal Ouahabi, followed by leading Thomas Shimada 6–0, 2–0 when he had to retire from the match, and finally Bjorn Rehnquist to gain a main draw birth. In the first round he would go on extend his winning streak to four matches by defeating Jean-René Lisnard in straight sets but would ultimately fall in the second round to Swiss player Ivo Heuberger. He made his ATP Tour doubles debut at the 2005 Croatia Open where he received a direct entry alongside Slovenian player Ladislav Svarc. They were defeated in the first round by an 18-year-old Novak Djokovic and Janko Tipsarevic.

Vagnozzi reached 24 singles finals in his career, posting a record of 8 wins and 16 losses which includes a 1–3 record in ATP Challenger finals. Additionally, he reached 54 doubles finals across his career with a record of 28 wins and 26 losses which includes a 16–21 record in ATP Challenger finals. He reached 1 career doubles final on the ATP Tour at the 2010 Swedish Open alongside compatriot Andreas Seppi. They were defeated by Robert Lindstedt and Horia Tecau
in straight sets .

Vagnozzi is currently the coach of fellow Italian ATP player Jannik Sinner.

ATP Tour career finals

Doubles: 1 (1 runner-up)

ATP Challenger and ITF Futures finals

Singles: 24 (8–16)

Doubles: 53 (28–25)

Performance timelines

Singles

Doubles

References

External links
 
 

Italian male tennis players
Living people
1983 births
21st-century Italian people